Hymn: Sarah Brightman In Concert is the sixth worldwide concert tour, and tenth tour altogether, by British soprano singer Sarah Brightman in support of her album Hymn (2018). The tour started on 24 November 2018, in São Paulo, Brazil, and will continue until 2021. The event is expected to include 125 shows in five different continents, thus becoming Brightman's largest tour of her career.

Background

On 6 August 2018, Brightman announced her return to the South American continent after five years with her promotional tour Hymn: Sarah Brightman In Concert. The concert tour included dates in Brazil, Chile, and Argentina in the months of November and December. A second date was added in Buenos Aires due to overwhelming demand. On 13 September, it was announced that Brightman's show in Santiago would be cancelled due to programming and logistical issues.

On 17 September, along with the official announcement of the album Hymn, the North American leg of the tour was announced, along with extra dates in Latin America. It was revealed that the tour would consist of 125 shows across five continents, thus becoming the largest tour of Brightman's career.

In promotion of her world tour, Brightman partnered with Swarovski to create the elaborate costumes and tiaras for the show's wardrobe.

On 21 January, Brightman announced on her official Instagram account that she would bring the tour to the United Kingdom with an official date at the Royal Albert Hall in London on 11 November, her first performance in London since the Harem World Tour in 2004.

Production
In an interview with Billboard, Brightman revealed that the show would be a larger production than the Dreamchaser World Tour, including a choir and live orchestra.

Set list
Act 1
 "Gothica"
 "Fleurs Du Mal"
 "Stranger in Paradise"
 "Carpe Diem" (featuring Mario Frangoulis in 2018 / Vincent Niclo 2019)
 "Sometimes I Dream" (Mario Frangoulis solo in 2018)
 "Ameno" (Vincent Niclo solo in 2019)
 "Anytime, Anywhere"
 "Gia nel seno"
 "Hijo de la Luna"
 "Follow Me"
 "Misere mei"
 "Figlio perduto"
 "Who Wants to Live Forever"
 "Tu che m'hai preso il cuor"
 "La Wally" 
 "Miracle" (featuring Yoshiki)
Act 2
  Hymn Overture
 "Hymn"
 "Sogni" (featuring Mario Frangoulis in 2018 / Vincent Niclo 2019)
 "Better Is One Day"
 "Canto Per Noi"
 "Pie Jesu" (Featuring Narcis)
 "Caruso" (Narcis solo)
 "Fly to Paradise"
 "Time to Say Goodbye"
 "Masquerade Overture"
 "The Phantom of the Opera" (featuring Mario Frangoulis in 2018 / Vincent Niclo 2019)
 "Running"
Encore
  "Deliver Me"
 "Ave Maria"
 "Sky and Sand" 
 "A Question of Honour"

TV and cinema event
On 10 September, Brightman announced via Facebook that a special show would be performed and filmed in Bavaria, Germany. The concert took place on 21 September at the Musiktheater Füssen and included special guests such as Mario Frangoulis, Vincent Niclo, Narcis, and Yoshiki. The filmed concert was released in cinemas through fathom Events for a special one-night showing on 8 November, a day before the album's release. 

The 90-minute TV and cinema event featured a slightly different set list and more elaborate staging than the live tour.

An abridged version of the concert was broadcast on PBS stations in the US from November 2018-January 2019. On 5 December, the edited version was released on DVD as both a pledge gift and for purchase through the official PBS online shop.

Cinema Event Set List

ACT I

 Gothica
 Fleurs Du Mal 
 Stranger In Paradise 
 Carpe Diem (featuring Mario Frangoulis)
 Anytime, Anywhere
 Gia Nel Seno
 Misere Mei (performed by orchestra and choir)
 Beautiful
 Follow Me
 Figlio Perduto
 Who Wants To Live Forever
 Tu Che M'Hai Preso Il Cuor
 Miracle (featuring Yoshiki)

ACT II

 Hymn Overture
 Hymn
 Sogni (featuring Vincent Niclo)
 There For Me (featuring Vincent Niclo)
 Better Is One Day
 Canto Per Noi
 Pie Jesu (featuring Narcis)
 Fly to Paradise 
 Time To Say Goodbye (2018 version)
 Masquerade Overture (performed by orchestra and choir)
 The Phantom of The Opera (featuring Mario Frangoulis)
 Sky and Sand

Tour dates

Cancelled/postponed shows

References 

Sarah Brightman concert tours
2018 concert tours
2019 concert tours